Hrothgar Mathews (born January 27, 1964) is a Canadian actor known for his performance as Gill St. George in the 1999 television film Milgaard.

Career 
He has also played the recurring roles of Mark Fellows in Tom Stone, Det. Charlie Klotchko in Da Vinci's Inquest and its spinoff Da Vinci's City Hall, Ned Yost in When Calls the Heart, and  Edwin Collar in Motherland: Fort Salem, and films including Johnny and Fathers & Sons. For his performance in Milgaard, Mathews won the Gemini Award for Best Supporting Actor in a Dramatic Program or Miniseries at the 14th Gemini Awards.

Personal life 
He is married to actress Gabrielle Rose.

Filmography

Film

Television

References

External links

1964 births
Canadian male film actors
Canadian male stage actors
Canadian male television actors
Best Supporting Actor in a Television Film or Miniseries Canadian Screen Award winners
Living people